Imre Garaba (born 29 July 1958) is a retired Hungarian football player and manager.

He made his debut for the Hungarian national team in 1980, and got 82 caps and 3 goals until 1991. He was a participant at the 1982 and 1986 FIFA World Cups, where Hungary on both occasions failed to progress from the group stage.

Imre was very popular among Budapest Honvéd supporters for his combative and heartfelt play, and because, in spite of playing a defender, he scored a number of important goals both for Honvéd and the Hungarian national team. He played a key role in having Budapest Honvéd win the Hungarian Championship in 1980, as well as in 1984, 1985 and 1986.
He later played with Rennes in France and Belgium's Charleroi, before ending his career back in Hungary with BVSC Budapest, where he also worked as a manager. He has lately not played a role in Hungarian football but remains a popular figure among Honvéd supporters.

References

1958 births
Living people
Hungarian footballers
Hungary international footballers
Budapest Honvéd FC players
Stade Rennais F.C. players
Ligue 2 players
R. Charleroi S.C. players
1982 FIFA World Cup players
1986 FIFA World Cup players
Hungarian football managers
MTK Budapest FC managers
Expatriate footballers in France
Expatriate footballers in Belgium
Association football defenders
Belgian Pro League players
People from Vác
Nemzeti Bajnokság I managers
Sportspeople from Pest County